Carvel Rock (sometimes spelled Carval Rock ) is an uninhabited islet of the British Virgin Islands in the Caribbean, less than  in size. It lies at the southern edge of the archipelago, south of and roughly between Ginger Island and Cooper Island.

The waters around it are a scuba diving site, but its sheer cliffs and lack of a beach make landing practically impossible.

Flora and fauna 
Sponge-covered boulders and fire coral create habitat for variety of fish — green morays, French grunts, blue tang, whitespotted filefish to name a few.
Divers reported observing sharks, barracuda, moray eels, lobsters, red lip blennies, amberjacks, groupers, queen triggerfish and black triggerfish, jewelfish, gobies, damselfish, mackerels, kingfish,  trumpetfish, spotted drums and high-hat triplefins.

Citations

Uninhabited islands of the British Virgin Islands